Fahad Al Kuwari (born 19 December 1968)  is a retired Qatari football midfielder who played for Qatar in the 2000 Asian Cup. He played for Al Sadd and served as captain for a period before retiring in 2003. He served as director of the Qatar national team at one point after his retirement.

References

External links
 
 Stats at Mundial 11

1968 births
Living people
Qatar international footballers
Association football midfielders
Qatari footballers
Al Sadd SC players
Umm Salal SC players
Qatar Stars League players
1992 AFC Asian Cup players
2000 AFC Asian Cup players